Plagiocladus is a genus of the family Phyllanthaceae, first described as a genus in 1987. It contains only one known species, Plagiocladus diandrus, native to central Africa (Cameroon, Gabon, Equatorial Guinea, Republic of Congo).

References

Phyllanthaceae
Phyllanthaceae genera
Monotypic Malpighiales genera
Flora of West-Central Tropical Africa